Benjamin Franklin Burkitt (July 5, 1843 – November 8, 1914) was an American newspaper editor and politician from the state of Mississippi.

Biography
Burkitt was born in Lawrenceburg, Tennessee in 1843 to Henry Lemuel Burkett and Louise Howell. Henry Burkett's ancestors had moved to North Carolina before the American Revolution, where Henry grew up before moving to Tennessee. Burkitt served in the 9th Battalion Tennessee Cavalry of the Confederate States Army during the American Civil War. After the war had ended, he taught in Alabama for two years, and moved to Houston, Mississippi in 1867, becoming the editor of the Houston Messenger in 1872. He moved the paper to Okolona, Mississippi in 1876 and renamed it the Peoples' Messenger, becoming active with the Mississippi State Grange. Burkitt was elected president of the Mississippi Press Association in 1883. Burkitt also began to practice law in 1872.

Political career
Burkitt began his political career when he was elected to the Mississippi House of Representatives as a Democrat in 1886, serving four terms. He was a delegate to the 1890 constitutional convention. In 1891, he joined the newly-formed Populist Party, and ran as that party's candidate for Mississippi's 4th congressional district in 1892, losing to Democrat Hernando Money and receiving 39% of the vote. Burkitt was appointed as a Democratic elector for the 1892 presidential election, but resigned in order to support the Populist ticket. He ran for Governor of Mississippi in the 1895 gubernatorial election, losing to Democrat Anselm J. McLaurin and receiving 28% of the vote. He rejoined the Democratic Party in 1900, and was elected again to the House in 1907. Burkitt was elected to the Mississippi State Senate in 1910, and served until his death on November 18, 1914 in Okolona.

Personal life
Burkitt married Mattie Schrimsher on December 30, 1866, and they had four children: Jennie Lee Cary, James Howell, Mary Louise King, and Bennie Dossett. He again married on December 30, 1906, this time to Mary Elizabeth Mitchell.

References

1843 births
1914 deaths
People from Houston, Mississippi
People from Lawrenceburg, Tennessee
Confederate States Army soldiers
Democratic Party Mississippi state senators
Democratic Party members of the Mississippi House of Representatives
Mississippi Populists
People from Okolona, Mississippi